To the Extreme is the major label debut studio album of American rapper Vanilla Ice released on September 3, 1990. The album contains Vanilla Ice's most successful singles, "Ice Ice Baby" and a cover of "Play That Funky Music". Although reviews of the album were mixed, To the Extreme spent 16 weeks at the top of the Billboard 200, and sold 15 million copies worldwide.

History
In early 1990, Vanilla Ice released an early version of To the Extreme under the title Hooked on Ichiban Records. "Play That Funky Music" was released as the album's first single, with "Ice Ice Baby" appearing as the B-side. The 12-inch single featured the radio, instrumental and a cappella versions of "Play That Funky Music" and the radio version and "Miami Drop" remix of "Ice Ice Baby". When a disc jockey played "Ice Ice Baby" instead of the single's A-side, the song gained more success than "Play That Funky Music". A music video for "Ice Ice Baby" was produced for $8,000. The video was financed by Vanilla Ice's manager, Tommy Quon, and shot on the roof of a warehouse in Dallas, Texas.

In 1990, Vanilla Ice signed to SBK Records, who reissued Hooked under the title To the Extreme. The reissue contained new artwork and music. "Ice Ice Baby" was given its own single, released in 1990 by SBK Records in the United States, and EMI Records in the United Kingdom. The SBK single contained the "Miami Drop", instrumental and radio mixes of "Ice Ice Baby" and the album version of "It's A Party". The EMI single contained the club and radio mixes of the song, and the shortened radio edit.

Music
Vanilla Ice wrote "Ice Ice Baby" at the age of 16, basing its lyrics upon the South Florida area in which he was raised. The lyrics describe a drive-by shooting and Vanilla Ice's rhyming skills. The chorus of "Ice Ice Baby" originates from the signature chant of the national African American fraternity Alpha Phi Alpha. The song's hook samples the bassline of the 1981 song "Under Pressure" by Queen and David Bowie. Freddie Mercury and David Bowie did not receive credit or royalties for the sample. In a 1990 interview, Vanilla Ice joked the two melodies were slightly different because he had added an additional note. Vanilla Ice later paid Mercury and Bowie, who have since been given songwriting credit for the sample. However, he ended up purchasing the rights to the song, because it was cheaper than licensing the sample.

The stylistic origins of "Rosta Man" are based upon reggae toasting.

Commercial performance
To the Extreme peaked at #1 on the Billboard 200 and selling over six million copies in just 14 weeks. The album spent 16 weeks at the top of the charts, and seven million copies were shipped across the United States. By March 1991, the album was closing in on 8 million units. To the Extreme was the best selling hip hop album up until that time. "Ice Ice Baby" has been credited for helping diversify hip hop by introducing it to a mainstream, white audience.

In Canada, the album peaked at the number one and was certified 6 times platinum and won the Best Selling Album by a Foreign Artist at  To The Extreme at the 1992 June Awards.

Critical reception 

Entertainment Weekly reviewer Dom Lombardo gave the album a B, calling the album "so consistent in its borrowings that it could be a parody, if it weren't for its total absence of wit", but concluding that "if there's about a two-to-one ratio of winners [...] to clunkers, that's not the worst track record for a debut album." Udovitch cited "Ice Ice Baby", "Play That Funky Music", "Dancin'" and "It's a Party" as the album's highlights. Robert Christgau gave the album a C− rating, writing that Vanilla Ice's "suave sexism, fashionably male supremacist rather than dangerously obscene, is no worse than his suave beats". Select stated that To The Extreme "packs in just about every musical and lyrical code of rap, yet still says nothing" and that "Kids and neophytes have a right to love it, but grown-ups will find Vanilla Ice spectacularly hollow."

AllMusic reviewer Steve Huey wrote that "Ice's mic technique is actually stronger and more nimble than MC Hammer's, and he really tries earnestly to show off the skills he does have. Unfortunately, even if he can keep a mid-tempo pace, his flow is rhythmically stiff, and his voice has an odd timbre; plus, he never seems sure of the proper accent to adopt. He's able to overcome those flaws somewhat in isolated moments, but they become all too apparent over the course of an entire album."

After audiences began to view Vanilla Ice as a novelty act, his popularity began to decline. He would later regain some success, attracting a new audience outside of the mainstream audience that had formerly accepted him, and then rejected him.

Track listing
The first version was released in 1989 by the independent record label Ichiban Records under the title Hooked. Vanilla Ice eventually signed to SBK Records, who reissued the album under its current name, To The Extreme, with some differences in the track list. To The Extreme contains all tracks from Hooked except for "Satisfaction", and six extra tracks: "Yo Vanilla", "Stop That Train", "Ice Is Workin' It", "Life Is A Fantasy", "Juice To Get Loose Boy" and "Havin' A Roni".

Personnel
The following people contributed on To the Extreme:
Vanilla Ice – vocals, lyrics, producer

Additional musicians
Paul Loomis – keyboards, producer, engineer, keyboard bass
Craig Pride – vocals

Technical personnel
Deshay – overdubs, beats
George Anderson – engineer
Tim Kimsey – engineer
Tommy Quon – executive producer
Kim Sharp – producer
Stacy Brownrigg - Engineer
Gary Wooten – engineer
Henry Falco – engineer
Khayree – producer
Janet Perr – art direction, design
Michael Lavine – photography
Darryl Williams – producer
Michael Sarsfield – engineer
David DeBerry – producer, bass, keys, programming, writer

Charts

Weekly charts

Year-end charts

Decade-end charts

Certifications

References

1989 debut albums
Ichiban Records albums
Vanilla Ice albums
SBK Records albums
Juno Award for International Album of the Year albums